Buchanan County Public Schools is the school district in charge of all public schools in Buchanan County, Virginia. The school system is managed by the School Board, headquartered in Grundy, Virginia, and the Superintendent is Melanie Hibbits. As of 2007, the school system's per pupil expenditure was $10,219, and its graduation rate was 75.7% in 2008.

Schools

Elementary/Middle Schools
Council Elementary/Middle School, Council
Hurley Elementary/Middle School, Hurley
Riverview Elementary/Middle School, Grundy
Twin Valley Elementary/Middle School, Oakwood

High schools
Council High School, Council
Grundy High School, Grundy
Hurley High School, Hurley
Twin Valley High School, Pilgrim's Knob

Specialty schools
B.C.C.T.H.L.C Buchanan County Career, Technology & Higher Learning Center

External links
Buchanan County Public Schools

References

Education in Buchanan County, Virginia
School divisions in Virginia